7th Cavalry is a 1956 American Western film directed by Joseph H. Lewis based on a story, "A Horse for Mrs. Custer," by Glendon Swarthout set after the Battle of the Little Big Horn. Filmed in Mexico, the picture stars Randolph Scott and Barbara Hale.

Plot
Captain Tom Benson has been granted a furlough to bring his bride–to–be Martha back to Fort Abraham Lincoln and his Regiment, the 7th Cavalry. Benson is mystified when he sees the fort apparently deserted with the colors not flying. Exploring the vacant post he is met by the hysterical Charlotte Reynolds, whose husband replaced Benson as commander of his "C" Company and was killed at the Battle of the Little Big Horn. Only a small group of misfits and guardhouse prisoners led by an old sergeant remain, and have held a wake by drinking themselves into oblivion.

Once the commands of Major Marcus Reno and Captain Frederick Benteen have returned, they and the widows hold Benson in contempt, not only for not being at the battle in command of his men, but for what they perceived as George Custer's liking for him, Benson's non–West Point background, and his career as a gambler until commissioned into the Regiment.

Martha's father Colonel Kellogg comes to the post to conduct a Board of Inquiry into Custer's actions that Benson sees as a smear against a man he admires who cannot defend himself.

When the President of the United States orders the recovery of the slain officers and the burial of the cavalrymen who fell in the battle, Benson takes his misfits and military prisoners into Indian territory to perform the task.

The Indians have made the land sacred ground and do not want to see the enemies they respected taken away from their burial site. A standoff develops as the cavalry insist on leaving the battleground with the dead officers' bodies. As the situation becomes tense a cavalryman is shot dead with an arrow whilst trying to escape. Then Custer's second horse (Dandy) appears – having been ridden out by a messenger who is unhorsed by an Indian scout away from the action – and is mistaken for Custer's dead horse (Vic) by the Indians. The bugler blows the call to charge and the horse gallops towards the cavalry's position. The Indians believe that Custer's spirit has returned and allow the cavalry to leave the field. Back at the camp, Captain Benson is reconciled with his father–in–law, and salutes as a 35–star American flag is lowered.

Cast
 Randolph Scott as Capt. Tom Benson
 Barbara Hale as Martha Kellogg
 Jay C. Flippen as Sgt. Bates
 Frank Faylen as Sgt. Kruger
 Jeanette Nolan as Charlotte Reynolds
 Leo Gordon as Vogel
 Denver Pyle as Dixon
 Harry Carey Jr. as Cpl. Morrison
 Michael Pate as Capt. Benteen
 Donald Curtis as Lt. Bob Fitch
 Frank Wilcox as Maj. Reno
 Pat Hogan as Young Hawk
 Russell Hicks as Col. Kellogg
 Peter Ortiz as Pollock

See also
 Randolph Scott filmography

References

Bibliography
 Evans, Alun. Brassey's Guide to War Films. Brassey's, 2000.  p. 180.

External links
 
 
 
 

1956 films
1956 Western (genre) films
1950s historical films
1950s English-language films
American historical films
American Western (genre) films
Films set in North Dakota
Films set in Montana
Columbia Pictures films
Films directed by Joseph H. Lewis
Films set in 1876
Western (genre) cavalry films
1950s American films